Valenzuela atricornis is a species of Psocoptera from Stenopsocidae family that can be found in United Kingdom and Ireland. They are also common in Austria, Belgium, Croatia, Denmark, Finland, France, Germany, Hungary, Italy, Luxembourg, Norway, Poland, Romania, Sweden, Switzerland, and the Netherlands. The species are  yellowish-orange.

Habitat
The species feeds on hawthorn and willow.

References

Stenopsocidae
Insects described in 1869
Psocoptera of Europe